Everette Brown (born August 7, 1987) is an American football coach and former linebacker who is currently the assistant linebackers coach for the Carolina Panthers of the National Football League (NFL). He played college football at Florida State and was drafted by the Carolina Panthers in second round of the 2009 NFL Draft. Brown also played for the San Diego Chargers, Detroit Lions, Philadelphia Eagles, Dallas Cowboys, and Washington Redskins.

Early years
Brown attended Beddingfield High School in Wilson, North Carolina, where he graduated in 2005. He was a two-sport star in football and track. In high school football, he recorded 120 tackles with 16 sacks as a senior. Brown also caught 40 passes for 770 yards and 10 touchdowns as a tight end. He played in the Shrine Bowl All-Star game.

Also an standout track & field athlete, Brown was a state qualifier in the sprinting events. He captured the state title in the 200-meter dash event at the 2002 NCHSAA 1A T&F Championships, recording a career-best time of 22.2 seconds. At the 2003 NCHSAA 1A T&F Championships, he took 9th in the 100-meter dash (11.5 s), 5th in the 200-meter dash (22.7 s) and 9th in the high jump (5 ft 10 in).

Regarded as a four-star recruit by Rivals.com, Brown was listed as the No. 3 weakside defensive end prospects in his class. Receiving numerous offers, he took official visits to Florida State, North Carolina, and Virginia Tech, before committing to the Seminoles.

College career
Brown red-shirted in 2005. In 2006 Brown was a Freshman All-America and All-ACC Freshman team honoree by The Sporting News. He played in all 13 games while starting three games. He finished eighth on the team and second among Seminole freshmen (behind Freshman All-American honoree Myron Rolle) in tackles with 27. He was second on the team in tackles for minus yardage with 13.5 and tied for third on the team with three quarterback sacks.

His sophomore season of 2007 he was a starter at the left defensive end position where he earned a career-high eight starting assignments for the season and he also recorded one start on the right side. He led the team in sacks, and led all defensive linemen in tackles and tackles for loss while totaling a single-season career-high 37 tackles, a single-season career-high 6.5 quarterback sacks and 11.5 tackles for minus yardage

In 2008, he was the Seminoles starter at the right defensive end position in each of the 13 games during the 2008 regular season. He earned All-America Second-team honors by Rivals.com, Associated Press, Scout.com and the Walter Camp Foundation. He was also the runner-up for ACC Player of the Year honors and the runner-up as the ACC Defensive Player of the Year. Brown was All-ACC First-team honors., a finalist for the Ted Hendricks Award. He finished the season third in the nation in sacks (13.5) and tied for fourth in the FBS in tackles for loss (21.5). He was the team leader as well as ACC leader with a career-high 21.5 tackles for loss and the team leader with a career-high 13.5 quarterback sacks.  He finished  second in school history with 46.5 tackles for loss. and ranks third all-time for a single-season with 13.5 quarterback sacks and fifth all-time with 23.0 career quarterback sacks. Finished season with 36 stops with a career-high 30 unassisted tackles and 36 total tackles. He completed his FSU with 100 career tackles in just three seasons.

Career statistics

Professional career

2009 NFL Draft
Having already received his college degree, Brown decided to forgo his final season of eligibility and enter the 2009 NFL Draft. Brown was considered “a perfect fit as a rush-linebacker in a 3-4 scheme” by ESPN′s Todd McShay.

Carolina Panthers
Originally projected a first-round draft pick, Brown saw his draft stock falling because of questions about his size.  He was picked 43rd overall in the second round by the Panthers, who traded their 2010 NFL Draft first-round pick to the San Francisco 49ers to get that pick.

With Julius Peppers still demanding a trade, Brown was shifted to the right side defensive end spot in June 2009. In his first NFL season, Brown recorded 22 total tackles (15 solo), 2.5 sacks and 2 forced fumbles.

On September 4, 2011, Brown was waived by Carolina after recording 6 sacks in two seasons.

San Diego Chargers
Brown signed with the San Diego Chargers on November 1, 2011. He was released on March 13, 2012.

Detroit Lions
Brown signed with the Detroit Lions on March 22, 2012.

Philadelphia Eagles
Brown signed with the Philadelphia Eagles on January 2, 2013. He was released on August 30, 2013.

Dallas Cowboys
Brown signed with the Dallas Cowboys on October 29, 2013. In his first game for the Cowboys five days later, he registered a sack on Minnesota Vikings's quarterback Christian Ponder in the Cowboys' 27-23 victory.

Brown was released by the Cowboys on February 28, 2014.

Washington Redskins
Brown signed with the Washington Redskins on July 28, 2014, their fifth day of training camp, after releasing outside linebacker Brandon Jenkins. The Redskins released him on August 30, 2014 for final roster cuts before the start of the 2014 season. He was re-signed on October 21, 2014, after a season-ending injury to Brian Orakpo, but was released on December 9, 2014.

Cleveland Browns
On August 16, 2015, Everette signed with the Cleveland Browns. On August 31, 2015, he was released by the Browns.

Coaching career

Carolina Panthers
On February 8, 2019, Brown was hired by the Carolina Panthers as an assistant linebackers coach.

Personal life
Brown was born in Stantonsburg, North Carolina, a small town with a current population of 706. During his time at Florida State, he volunteered at various schools and spoke at campaigns designed to warn children about the ill effects of tobacco.

References

External links
Official Website

Florida State Seminoles bio 

1987 births
Living people
People from Wilson County, North Carolina
Players of American football from North Carolina
American football defensive ends
Florida State Seminoles football players
Carolina Panthers players
Cleveland Browns players
San Diego Chargers players
Detroit Lions players
Philadelphia Eagles players
Dallas Cowboys players
Washington Redskins players